Shawki (also spelled Shawky, Shawqi, Shawqi, Shoghi) ,  or ), is a masculine Arabic given name and surname.

It may refer to:

Given name
Shawqi Aboud, Iraqi football manager
Shawki Awad Balzuhair (born 1981), citizen of Yemen, held in extrajudicial detention in the US Guantanamo Bay detainment camps in Cuba
Shawki Ibrahim Abdel-Karim Allam, Grand Mufti of Egypt
Shawky Gharib (born 1959), Egyptian football player
Şevki Balmumcu (1905–1982), Turkish architect
Shoghí Effendí  (March 1, 1897 – November 4, 1957), Guardian and appointed head of the Baháʼí Faith from 1921 until his death in 1957
Shawqi Abdul Amir (12 September 1949), Iraqi poet

Middle name
Yakup Şevki Subaşı (1876–1939), also known as Yakub Shevki Pasha, general of the Ottoman Army and the Turkish Army

Surname
Ahmed Shawqi (1868–1932), Egyptian pan-Arab poet, dramatist
Ahmed Chawki, Moroccan singer, also known as Chawki
Ayman Shawky (born 1962), Egyptian football player
Farid Shawki (1920–1998), Egyptian actor, screenwriter and film producer
Maged Shawky, Egyptian businessman and administrator
Mohamed Shawki (born 1981), Egyptian footballer
Tarek Shawki (born 1957), the Chief of the ICTs Section within the "Information Society Division" in UNESCO, Paris, France

Others
Ahmed Shawki Museum, museum in Cairo, Egypt, in tribute of poet Ahmed Shawqi
Chawki silkworms, alternative name for Bombyx mori

Arabic-language surnames
Arabic masculine given names